Cosmochthoniidae is a family of cosmochthoniids in the order Oribatida. There are about 6 genera and at least 40 described species in Cosmochthoniidae.

Genera
 Cosmochthonius Berlese, 1910
 Gozmanyina Balogh & Mahunka, 1983
 Krivolutskiella Gordeeva, 1980
 Nipponiella Gordeeva, 1980
 Phyllozetes Gordeeva, 1978
 Trichthonius Hammer, 1961

References

Further reading

 
 
 
 

Acariformes
Acari families